The following highways are numbered 902:

Costa Rica
 National Route 902

United States